Herbert Banemann Rawlinson (15 November 1885 – 12 July 1953) was an English-born stage, film, radio, and television actor. A leading man during Hollywood's silent film era, Rawlinson transitioned to character roles after the advent of sound films.

Early life
Rawlinson was born in New Brighton, Cheshire, England, UK on 15 November 1885. He was one of the four sons and three daughters of Robert Theodore Rawlinson and his wife Emily. He sailed to America on the same ship as Charlie Chaplin to establish himself as a leading man in the silent movies before making the transition as a character actor in the "talkies".

Recognition
For his contribution to the motion picture industry, Herbert Rawlinson has a star on the Hollywood Walk of Fame located at 6150 Hollywood Blvd on 8 February 1960.

Personal life
Rawlinson married Roberta Arnold in 1917. They divorced in 1923 in which he had cited desertion. He married Loraine Abigail Long in 1924 and divorced in 1927. He was later married to Josephine Norman until her death on 24 January 1951. He died of lung cancer in 1953, immediately after starring in Ed Wood's 1954 crime drama Jail Bait.

Main filmography

Film

Television

References

External links

 
 
 Herbert Rawlinson at Turner Classic Movies 
 Short biography at archive of Al White Studio

English expatriates in the United States
English male film actors
English male radio actors
English male silent film actors
English male stage actors
English male television actors
Deaths from lung cancer in California
People from Brighton
1885 births
1953 deaths
20th-century English male actors